Discovering Gloria is an unreleased documentary film by Boaz Dvir. The documentary captures Gloria Merriex’s transformation into an educational innovator and shows her engaging her math, reading, and science students at the most effective levels through her innovations, which included hip-hop and dance routines.

Background 
Gloria Jean Merriex grew up in Gainesville, Fla. on the east side of the city. She earned an education degree from the University of Florida, and would spend her entire career at Duval Elementary School. In 2008, she died of a diabetic stroke, one day after receiving a W.K. Kellogg Foundation grant to share her teaching breakthroughs on a national level.

Dvir decided to make a film about the school after talking with Don Pemberton, director of UF’s Lastinger Center for Learning, who had previously sent professors and doctoral students to watch Merriex's teaching methods. While Dvir never personally met Merriex, he had over 150 hours of footage to use for his project.

While Steve Whitney contributed as well as a co-producer, most of the funding for the film came from the Kellogg Foundation itself, with Dvir being permitted final cut on the project. "I never had even one conversation with Kellogg about the making of the film," Dvir said. "I interviewed a Kellogg rep as part of the filming process, but he never asked me about what I was doing. He simply answered my questions. I’ve never even screened the rough cut for Kellogg!"

Dvir admitted that after working on the film, his own thinking had shifted: "[Discovering Gloria] made me feel quite differently about standardized testing."

Synopsis 

The film focuses on Merriex’s transformation by way of archival footage and interviews with her students, family, and colleagues.

In one of those interviews, Prof. Elizabeth Bondy – director of the University of Florida College of Education’s School of Teaching and Learning, who studied Merriex's methods – described how and why Merriex broke vital new ground.

"She didn't move to using music because she studied Howard Gardner's work about multiple intelligences," Bondy says in the documentary. "She moved to using music and movement and the other strategies that she used because she studied her students."

Discovering Gloria shows how Merriex helped Duval Elementary leap from an F on the Florida Comprehensive Assessment Test in 2002 to an A the following year.

Reception 
Nearly 500 people – including many of Merriex's former students – attended a screening of a rough cut version for it in September 2013 at her home community of East Gainesville. The post-screening panel discussion featured Bondy along with University of Texas Assistant Prof. Emily Bonner, Alachua County School Board Member Leanetta McNealy, and UF College of Education Associate Dean for Research Thomasenia Adams.

In her book Unearthing Culturally Responsive Mathematics Teaching, Emily Bonner described the documentary as "compelling".

In her op-ed in the St. Augustine Record, Pam Thor called Discovering Gloria a "fabulous documentary" and urged all teachers and policymakers to watch it.

In her article in The Gainesville Sun about the documentary’s first screening, Aida Mallard wrote that Discovering Gloria brings Gloria Jean Merriex "to life".

References 

Unreleased American films
Documentary films about education in the United States
Films shot in Florida
American documentary films
Education in Alachua County, Florida
Films directed by Boaz Dvir
Documentary films about Florida